Archibald K. Dougherty (June 26, 1835December 30, 1923) was a Michigan politician.

Early life
Dougherty was born on June 26, 1835, in Saint John, New Brunswick, Canada.

Career
On November 2, 1886, Dougherty was elected as a Republican member of the Michigan House of Representatives where he represented Charlevoix County and served from January 5, 1887, to 1888.

Personal life
Dougherty had at least four children, including Michigan Attorney General Andrew B. Dougherty.

Death
Dougherty died on December 30, 1923, in Lansing, Michigan. Dougherty was interred at Maple Grove Cemetery in Elk Rapids, Michigan.

References

1835 births
1923 deaths
Republican Party members of the Michigan House of Representatives
Burials in Michigan
19th-century American politicians